The Awdiinle Massacre was a massacre of over thirty Somali civilians carried out by Ethiopian soldiers in Somalia as part of the African Union Mission to Somalia on Sunday July 17, 2016. The massacre occurred in the village of Awdiinle, 30 km west of Baidoa.

Events
Ethiopian troops attacked a house where a local religious leader was reading the Qur'an. Locals allege the attack was carried out as retribution for an Al-Shabab ambush suffered by the Ethiopians.

See also
Al-Hidaya Mosque massacre

References

Somali Civil War (2009–present)
Military operations involving Ethiopia
Massacres in Somalia
Massacres in 2016
July 2016 events in Africa
Ethiopia–Somalia military relations
2016 crimes in Somalia